Crimson Gem Saga is a role-playing video game developed for the PlayStation Portable and iOS. It was developed by South Korean studio IRONNOS and published in Korea by SK Telecom as Astonishia Story 2. It was released in North America on May 26, 2009 by Atlus under the title Crimson Gem Saga, and was released in Japan under the title Garnet Chronicle by Sega.

The game is set in the world of Latein, where, unbeknownst to the public, an artifact formerly known as the Crimson Gem is being sought. One of the parties caught up in the whirlwind is Killian von Rohcoff, a recent graduate of the Green Hill Chevalier Academy, the game's protagonist. The game is a sequel in story to Astonishia Story, but since much of the game's mechanics were changed, the title in all regions was also changed.

Gameplay
Combat in Crimson Gem Saga is similar to many turn-based RPGs. The most noticeable quirk is the ambush system. If contact between the player's icon and a generic monster icon occur on a field map, a battle will occur.  If the player touches the monster icon while the monster is facing away from the player, the player will gain an immediate preliminary attack with the combined force of all party members. If the monster has a "!" symbol appear above their head, and contacts the player after that symbol disappears, the enemy may begin battle with a preemptive attack on the player with the combined force of all the enemy party members.

The game also features a weapon and skill customization system, as well as combination attacks that include anywhere from 2 to 4 party members.

Story
The story of the game revolves around the protagonist Killian von Rohcoff, who seems to always be on the wrong end of fate. He somehow gets caught up with the search for a powerful ancient artifact.

Characters
Killian von Rohcoff: Killian is the protagonist of this game. When the game begins we find him attempting to shake off the effects of last night's partying in order to make it in time to attend his own graduation.

Herbert von Guterrian: Herbert is Killian's rival, and they've been enemies since the day they first met at Green Hill Academy. He constantly annoys Killian with his arrogance, his unique laugh, and the way that he always beats Killian at everything.

Spinel: Spinel is an elf, and a self-described "treasure hunter extraordinaire". She meets up with Killian at the beginning of the game and only further complicates his life.

Jeffrey: Jeffrey also meets up with Killian at the beginning of the game, and is probably the only character who has even worse luck than Killian. He first runs into Killian while in the middle of a dispute with Spinel.

Henson: Henson's a mysterious, wise-cracking mage who is both quick with a burning insult and a burning fireball. Not much is known about his past.

Gelts: Gelts is a former priest who has renounced his old ways. Now his hobbies include boozing and womanizing. He wields a giant hammer in battle.

Lahduk: Lahduk is even more mysterious than Henson, and likely even more powerful.

Acelora: Acelora is one of the Radiant Crusaders that serve the Order of Light. She's quickly rising through the ranks, and thinks of nothing other than aiding the Order.

Reception

The game was met with positive to average reception.  GameRankings and Metacritic gave it a score of 79.02% and 78 out of 100 for the PSP version, and 69.75% and 70 out of 100 for the iOS version.

Most reviewers noted that the game doesn't do anything particularly innovative or new, but it follows the formula so well that they can forgive that. Many of the early reviews have also favorably commented on both the quality of the writing, and the quality of the voice acting. GameSpot has been the most critical so far, with their reviewer noting that they felt the game was simple and uninspired.

iOS release
On August 3, 2010 Crimson Gem Saga was released on Apple's App Store for iOS. It was featured on the App Store's "New and Noteworthy" category for Role Playing iOS Games specifically and for all iOS Games, "Top Grossing Role Playing Game" and "What's Hot" categories. It has not been updated for years, and no longer functions on the current iOS.

References

External links
 Official North American website from Atlus U.S.A.
 

Atlus games
Fantasy video games
2008 video games
PlayStation Portable games
IOS games
Role-playing video games
Video games developed in South Korea
Video games with cel-shaded animation